Qarah Tappeh (also known as Qarah Tappeh-ye Sheykhlū) is a village in Vilkij-e Markazi Rural District, Vilkij District, Namin County, Ardabil Province, Iran. At the 2006 census, its population was 667, in 138 families.

References 

Towns and villages in Namin County